Tirtha or Teertha may refer to:

 Teertha, Dharwad, village in Karnataka, India
 Tirtha (Hinduism), a pilgrimage center in Hinduism
 Tirtha (Jainism), a pilgrimage center in Jainism
 Tirtha (album), an album by pianist Vijay Iyer
 Theertham, holy water given at temples